Buzzi is an Italian surname. Notable people with the surname include:

Aldo Buzzi (b. 1910), Italian architect
Arturo Buzzi-Peccia (1854–1943), Italian-American songwriter
Carlo Buzzi, a seventeenth-century Italian painter
Carlo Buzzi (17th-century architect) architect of the Lombard Baroque school.
David Buzzi (b. 1968), Swiss singer and songwriter
Emanuele Buzzi (born 1994), Italian alpine ski racer
Fabio Buzzi (born 1943), Italian motorboat builder and racer
Ippolito Buzzi (1562–1634), Italian sculptor
Luigi Buzzi Leone (1823–1909), an Italian sculptor from Viggiù in the Province of Varese
Martín Buzzi (b. 1967), Argentine politician
Paolo Buzzi (1874–1956), Italian playwright and poet
Ruth Buzzi (b. 1936), American actor and comedian
Yuri Buzzi (born 1978), Italian actor and writer
Giovanni Buzzi (born 1996), Italian fencer

See also
Al-Buzzi (d. 864), Persian, canonical reciter of the Qur'an
Buzzi Unicem, an Italian cement company headquartered in Casale Monferrato
6517 Buzzi, an asteroid

Italian-language surnames